The Valdivia River or Río Valdivia, as it is known locally, is a major river in southern Chile. It is the continuation of the Calle-Calle River, from the point where it meets the Cau-Cau River in the city of Valdivia. The Valdivia river ends in Corral Bay, on the Pacific coast. Other tributaries are the Cruces River, the Tornagaleones River and the Futa River. Pedro de Valdivia Bridge crosses the river in downtown Valdivia.

References

External links 
 Valdivia River

Valdivia River
Rivers of Los Ríos Region
Rowing venues in Chile